Mango oil, mango kernel fat, or mango butter, is an oil fraction obtained during the processing of mango butter. Mango oil is a seed oil extracted from the stone of the mango, the fruit of the Mangifera indica tree. The oil is semi-solid at room temperatures, but melts on contact with warm skin, making it appealing for baby creams, suncare balms, hair products, and other moisturizing products.

Extraction
Fat is extracted from dried mango kernels by hydraulic pressure, or by solvent extraction. In solvent extraction, hexane, a liquid hydrocarbon, is used as the extraction medium. The collected mango stones are washed with well-water soon after collection. After washing, the seeds are sun-dried to reduce the moisture content to 12-15%. The dried seed stone is roasted in a drum roaster and the hull is removed mechanically, or manually by beating with wooden clubs. The separated kernels are crushed into small pieces in a hammer mill. The mango kernel pieces are conveyed to a pellet making machine and pellets are formed. The pellets are cooled to room temperature in a cooler and are conveyed to the solvent extraction plant. Some processors produce flakes by crushing the seeds in a flaking roller mill.

Composition and characteristics of oil/fat

Physical characteristics of mango kernel oil

Fatty acids present in mango fat

Uses

Can be used as a substitute for cocoa butter in chocolate manufacturing.

See also
Mango

References 

Vegetable oils